Para tertiary butylphenol formaldehyde resin also known as p-tert-butylphenol-formaldehyde resin (PTBP-FR) or 4-(1,1-dimethylethyl) phenol (PTBP Formaldehyde) is a phenol-formaldehyde resin found in commercial adhesives, and in particular in adhesives used to bond leather and rubber.  It has broad usage in a large variety of industries and can be found in many household items and textile products, and in particular it is used in the manufacture of shoes.

Ingredients and manufacture
The main ingredients of any Phenol formaldehyde resin is a phenol or substituted phenol and formaldehyde. The two main components of Para tertiary butylphenol formaldehyde resin are thus Para tertiary butyl phenol and formaldehyde. There have been a number of patents on their production.

Contact Dermatitis 

It is noteworthy because this resin can cause severe allergic contact dermatitis in a significant percentage of individuals who come into contact with the resin.   Most cases of dermatitis result from contact with shoes, watchbands, belts, wet suits, handbags, purses, wallets, hats, fabric glues, furniture and upholstery glues, wood glues, waterproof glues, rubber handled tools, dental bonding resins, box adhesives, disposable diapers, lip liner, and rubber athletic insoles.  Use of PTBP-FR in manufacturing is ubiquitous across numerous industries and commercial products, but most commonly its usage in the manufacture of shoes is implicated in the majority of cases involving contact dermatitis.

References

External websites 

 
Effects of external causes
Immunology
Immune system